Ibrahim Hooper (born Douglas Hooper) is the National Communications Director and spokesman for the Council on American-Islamic Relations (CAIR), a Washington D.C.-based Muslim civil rights and advocacy organization.

Early life, education, and early career
Hooper was born in Canada and immigrated to the United States after converting to Islam. He holds a bachelor's degree in history, and a master's of art in journalism and mass communications. During the late 1980s and early 1990s, Hooper worked as a news producer at WCCO-TV, the CBS affiliate in Minneapolis.

Council on American-Islamic Relations
Hooper joined CAIR in 1994. He is the spokesman for CAIR and has appeared on Fox News, CBS, NBC, ABC in addition to being widely quoted in newspapers such as The Wall Street Journal, the Washington Post and The New York Times.

References
https://www.cair.com/ibrahimhooper

Notes

External links

Abu-Nasr, Donna, "Muslims learning how to spread the word in U.S.," Pittsburgh Post-Gazette, August 30, 1996

Living people
Year of birth missing (living people)
Converts to Islam
Canadian emigrants to the United States
American Muslims
American Muslim activists